KEPCO E&C (full name: KEPCO Engineering & Construction Company, INC., formerly: KOPEC) is a power plant design and engineering company in South Korea.  It was established in 1975 as a public enterprise. KEPCO E&C engages in designing, engineering, and constructing nuclear and fossil power plants. The company operates as a subsidiary of Korea Electric Power Corporation (KEPCO).

KEPCO E&C is providing total integrated Engineering, procurement and construction (EPC) services. It has designed and built a total of 14 nuclear power plants using their own technology, including the development of APR-1400 next-generation nuclear power plant. The company has also designed and built over 40 coal power plants and combined cycle & cogeneration plants. In 2006, KEPCO E&C won the 'Be award', Plant:Multidiscipline Engineering, for the Shin-Kori Nuclear Power Plant in Korea.

KEPCO E&C became the world's first business to develop the low-temperature DeNOx catalyst.

See also 
 Korea Electric Power Corporation (KEPCO)
 Korea Hydro & Nuclear Power (KHNP)

References

External links 
 

Nuclear technology companies of South Korea
Electrical engineering companies of South Korea
Construction and civil engineering companies established in 1975
South Korean companies established in 1975